The 2016–17 Bnei Sakhnin season was the club's 27th season since its establishment in 1991, and 10th straight season in the Israeli Premier League since promoting from Liga Leumit in 2006–07.

During the 2016–17 campaign the club have competed in the Israeli Premier League, State Cup, Toto Cup.

Match results

Legend

League

State Cup

Toto Cup

Player details
List of squad players, including number of appearances by competition

|}

Transfers

In

Out

See also
 List of Bnei Sakhnin F.C. seasons

References

2016–17 in Israeli football
Bnei Sakhnin F.C. seasons
Bnei Sakhnin